100% Wolf is a 2020 Australian computer-animated adventure fantasy comedy film directed by Alexs Stadermann and produced by Alexia Gates-Foale and Barbara Stephen. It is adapted from Jayne Lyons' 2009 novel of the same name.

Plot 
Freddy Lupin is the young heir to a werewolf pack that has been protecting their local town for years. When he attempts to follow his family during their nightly patrol using a magical Moonstone, he loses the Moonstone to Foxwell Cripp, and Flashheart is apparently killed when he falls off a cliff. Freddy's uncle Hotspur becomes the new pack leader.

Six years later, the time comes for Freddy to experience his first wolf transformation, but despite the encouragement of long-term housekeeper Mrs. Mutton, he is humiliated when he turns into a poodle instead. Faced with the disdain of his pack, Freddy is challenged to prove his wolf status by moonrise the next day or risk being banished. Freddy decides to try and retrieve the Moonstone from Cripp.

While searching in town, Freddy befriends Batty, a stray dog also known as 'Houndini' for her ability to escape the dog catchers consistently. Batty leads him to Cripp, where they are both caught by dog catchers and placed in Coldfax Dog Pound. After an escape attempt goes wrong, Freddy is sent to a pit with 'the Beast', an unknown monster that supposedly eats dogs. Freddy learns that the 'Beast' is actually his father. The dog catchers captured Flasheart after he was injured by the fall, and Hotspur left him in Coldfax with a silver bracelet to keep him trapped in his wolf state. Batty and the other dogs escape into the vents and help Freddy free his father.

Freddy leads Flasheart and the dogs home to confront Hotspur. Cripp attacks the other wolves with a mass of silver concentrate, but Freddy stops Cripp's attack. Hotspur tries to attack while the other wolves are weakened by the silver, but the dogs are able to get the wolves to safety while Freddy lures his uncle to the mansion roof. Transforming back into a poodle in the moonlight and accepting his form, Freddy lets out a loud roar to affirm his status as an alpha wolf, sending Hotspur falling back into the mansion and affirming his failure as a leader.

Sometime later, Freddy's reflections reveal that not only have werewolves and dogs gotten on better terms, but the pack has also opened the mansion up to all dogs, with Hotspur and his children reduced to dog-walkers and picking up after the mutts, while Coldfax is shut down. Flasheart has returned to his old role as pack leader, but assures Freddy that he is proud of him and believes he will be a good leader when the time comes.

Cast

Sequel 
A sequel titled 200% Wolf is expected to be released in 2024.

Reception 

100% Wolf earned a total of $7.7 million worldwide.

On Rotten Tomatoes the film has an approval rating of 67% based on reviews from 15 critics.

TV series 
A 26-episode TV series spin-off, 100% Wolf: Legend of the Moonstone (Season 1) screened on ABC ME from 28 December 2020, produced by Flying Bark Productions and Studio 100 Animation.

References

External links 
 
 

2020 films
2020 computer-animated films
2020s children's animated films
2020s Australian animated films
Australian animated feature films
Australian computer-animated films
Australian children's animated films
2020s English-language films
Films directed by Alexs Stadermann
Animated films about friendship
Werewolves in animated film
Films about father–son relationships
Films about shapeshifting
Animated films about dogs
Screen Australia films
STX Entertainment films
Flying Bark Productions films
2020s Australian animated television series